Dragicina, Dragićina or Dragičina may refer to:

Dragićina (Čitluk), a village in Čitluk, Bosnia and Herzegovina
Dragičina (Grude), a village in Grude, Bosnia and Herzegovina